Ingi Randver Jóhannsson (5 December 1936 – 30 October 2010) was an Icelandic chess International Master (1963), four-time Icelandic Chess Championship winner (1956, 1958, 1959, 1963).

Biography
From the mid-1950s to mid-1980s, Ingi Randver Jóhannsson was also one of the leading Icelandic chess players. He four times won the Icelandic Chess Championship: 1956, 1958, 1959, and 1963.

Ingi Randver Jóhannsson played for Iceland in the Chess Olympiads:
 In 1954, at reserve board in the 11th Chess Olympiad in Amsterdam (+2, =4, -7),
 In 1956, at second board in the 12th Chess Olympiad in Moscow (+5, =9, -4),
 In 1958, at first board in the 13th Chess Olympiad in Munich (+7, =6, -3),
 In 1966, at second board in the 17th Chess Olympiad in Havana (+4, =8, -4),
 In 1968, at first board in the 18th Chess Olympiad in Lugano (+6, =4, -5),
 In 1974, at third board in the 21st Chess Olympiad in Nice (+6, =9, -2),
 In 1980, at second reserve board in the 24th Chess Olympiad in La Valletta (+2, =2, -0),
 In 1982, at second reserve board in the 25th Chess Olympiad in Lucerne (+0, =1, -2).

Ingi Randver Jóhannsson played for Iceland in the European Team Chess Championship preliminaries:
 In 1983, at seventh board (+0, =0, -3).

Ingi Randver Jóhannsson played for Iceland in the Telechess Olympiads:
 In 1978, at third board (+0, =2, -1),
 In 1982, at fifth board (+1, =0, -0).

Ingi Randver Jóhannsson played for Iceland in the Nordic Chess Cups:
 In 1973, at third board (+3, =2, -0) and won individual gold medal,
 In 1977, at second board (+1, =1, -3).

In 1963, he was awarded the FIDE International Master (IM) title.

References

External links

Ingi Randver Jóhannsson chess games at 365chess.com

1936 births
2010 deaths
Icelandic chess players
Chess International Masters
Chess Olympiad competitors